Odelein is a surname. Notable people with the surname include:

Lee Odelein (1967–2017), Canadian ice hockey player
Lyle Odelein (born 1968), Canadian ice hockey player, brother of Selmar and Lee
Selmar Odelein (born 1966),  Canadian ice hockey player